The 2010 Richmond Raiders season was the first season as a professional indoor football franchise and their first in the American Indoor Football Association (AIFA). One of 13 teams competing in the AIFA for the 2010 season.

In July, 2009, the American Indoor Football Association announced that they would be expanding into Richmond, Virginia. After a month-long name-the-team contest, the Richmond franchise announced that it would be nicknamed the Raiders on August 5, 2009.

The Raiders' first game was the 2010 AIFA Kickoff Classic; on January 23, 2010, where they played an exhibition game against the AIFA All-Stars at the Richmond Coliseum.

On May 5, 2010, defensive coordinator Charles Gunnings replaced Mike Siani as the head coach, as Siani resigned.

Schedule
Key:

Preseason

Regular season

Roster

Division Standings

 Green indicates clinched playoff berth
 Purple indicates division champion
 Grey indicates best league record

References

2010 American Indoor Football Association season
2010 in sports in Virginia
Richmond Raiders